The Spring River is a tributary, only about  long, of the Deschutes River in Deschutes County in the U.S. state of Oregon. The Spring River has no named tributaries.

The creek has few resident fish but provides spawning and rearing habitat for the rainbow and brown trout and other species from the Deschutes. The lower river is accessible through United States Forest Service land.

See also
 List of rivers of Oregon

References

External links
Upper Deschutes Watershed Council

Rivers of Oregon
Rivers of Deschutes County, Oregon